Tisbite Rakotoarisoa is a Malagasy Olympic middle-distance runner. He represented his country in the men's 1500 meters and the men's 800 meters at the 1980 Summer Olympics. His time was a 3:55.90 in the 1500, and a 1:50.50 in the 800 heats.

References

1951 births
Living people
Malagasy male middle-distance runners
Olympic athletes of Madagascar
Athletes (track and field) at the 1980 Summer Olympics